Rush of Fools is the self-titled debut studio album from Christian rock band Rush of Fools. It was released on May 8, 2007, on Midas Records.

Track listing
 "Undo" (Kevin Huguley, Wes Willis, Scott Davis) – 3:41
 "We All" (Huguley, Willis, Matt Bronleewe, Jason Ingram) – 3:23
 "When Our Hearts Sing" (Huguley, Willis, Bronleewe, Ingram) – 2:52
 "Your Love" (Huguley, Bronleewe, Ingram) – 3:06
 "Fame" (Huguley, Willis, Davis) – 3:31
 "Peace Be Still" (Huguley, Willis, Bronleewe, Ingram) – 4:35
 "All We Ever Needed" (Willis, Ingram) – 4:18
 "Can't Get Away" (Huguley, Willis, Davis, Sam Mizell) – 4:14
 "For Those" (Huguley, Bronleewe, Ingram) – 4:03
 "Jesus Hurry" (Huguley, Willis, Davis) – 3:38
 "Already" (Willis, Bronleewe, Ingram) – 4:01

Chart positions
The album reached No. 181 on the Billboard 200 chart, and No. 9 on the Top Christian Albums chart.

Awards

In 2008, the album was nominated for a Dove Award for Pop/Contemporary Album of the Year at the 39th GMA Dove Awards. The song "Undo" was also nominated for Pop/Contemporary Recorded Song of the Year.

References

2007 debut albums
Rush of Fools albums
Midas Records Nashville albums